The 1940 United States presidential election in California took place on November 5, 1940, as part of the 1940 United States presidential election. State voters chose 22 representatives, or electors, to the Electoral College, who voted for president and vice president.

California voted for the Democratic incumbent, Franklin Roosevelt, over the Republican challenger, businessman Wendell Willkie.

Willkie did nonetheless make considerable gains vis-à-vis the previous Republican nominee, Alf Landon, who remains the solitary Republican nominee to not carry a single county in the state. Willkie carried seven counties scattered across the state and gained ten percentage points on Landon's performance.

This remains the last election when the Democrats have won Sutter County, which as of the 2020 presidential election, stands as the longest run voting for one party by any California county. Mono County would not vote Democratic again until John Kerry in 2004.

Results

Results by county

References

California
1940
1940 California elections